Ibuki Hara (born 30 June 1998) is a Japanese professional footballer who plays as a midfielder for WE League club MyNavi Sendai.

Club career 
Hara made her WE League debut on 2 October 2021.

References

External links 
 
 

Japanese women's footballers
Living people
1998 births
Women's association football midfielders
Mynavi Vegalta Sendai Ladies players
WE League players
Association football people from Kanagawa Prefecture